Ilya Valeryevich Bykovsky (born 16 February 2001) is a Russian football player. He plays for FC Ural Yekaterinburg.

Club career
He made his debut in the Russian Premier League for FC Ural Yekaterinburg on 29 July 2022 in a game against FC Krasnodar.

Career statistics

References

External links
 
 
 

2001 births
People from Lyubertsy
Sportspeople from Moscow Oblast
Living people
Russian footballers
Russia youth international footballers
Association football defenders
FC Ural Yekaterinburg players
Russian Second League players
Russian Premier League players